Sułkowice  is a town in southern Poland, situated in the Lesser Poland Voivodeship (since 1999), previously in Kraków Voivodeship (1975–1998).

Sport 
 Meble-Ryś Gościbia Sułkowice - women's handball team

External links 
 Jewish Community in Sułkowice on Virtual Shtetl

Cities and towns in Lesser Poland Voivodeship
Myślenice County